Air Colombia was a cargo airline with a hub at La Vanguardia Airport in Villavicencio, Colombia. It was known for being one of several Colombian airlines who continued to use World War II-era Douglas C-47 aircraft into the 2010s. The airline suspended operations after filing for administration in September 2019.

Fleet

Air Colombia previously operated the following aircraft:
1 Antonov An-32B (leased)
1 Boeing 727-100F
4 Douglas C-47 Skytrain
2 Douglas C-118
1 Short SC.7 Skyvan

See also
List of airlines of Colombia

References

External links
 Anthony Bourdain: Parts Unknown. Season 1. Episode 3.

Airlines of Colombia
Colombian companies established in 1980
Airlines established in 1980
Airlines disestablished in 2019